The Greenhornes is the eponymous second studio album by The Greenhornes.

Track listing
All songs written by The Greenhornes.

 Can't Stand It – 3:21
 Shadow of Grief - 2:50
 Stay Away Girl – 3:36
 Inside Looking Out – 3:33
 It's My Soul – 2:59
 Let Me Be – 2:50
 Lies – 3:15
 Nobody Loves You – 3:41 
 Lonely Feeling – 3:47
 High Time Baby – 2:57
 Shame and Misery – 3:31
 Can't You See – 4:24

Personnel
Craig Fox - guitars, vocals
Patrick Keeler - percussion, drums
Jack Lawrence - bass
Jared McKinney - keyboard
Brian Olive - guitar

References

2001 albums
The Greenhornes albums
Telstar Records albums